Moccasin is an unincorporated community in Effingham County, in the U.S. state of Illinois.

History
A post office called Moccasin was established in 1862, and remained in operation until 1943. The community was named for the Indian moccasin. Joseph P. Condo (1848–1923), Illinois state representative, lived in Moccasin.

References

Unincorporated communities in Effingham County, Illinois
1862 establishments in Illinois
Unincorporated communities in Illinois